The 232nd Signal Regiment is a deployable signals regiment of the Italian Army based in Avellino in Campania. The unit was formed in 1958 as a battalion and assigned to the Armored Division "Ariete". In 1975 the battalion was named for the Fadalto Pass and received the number 232nd, which had been used by the 232nd Connections Company that served with the 132nd Armored Division "Ariete" during the Western Desert Campaign of World War II. With the name and number the battalion also received its own flag. In 1991 the battalion was disbanded and in 2004 reformed as 232nd Signal Regiment, which initially consisted only of the Battalion "Legnano". In 2015 the regiment reformed the Battalion "Fadalto" as its second signal battalion. The regiment is assigned to the army's Signal Command and affiliated with the Division "Acqui".

History

World War II 

In February 1939 the 132nd Mixed Engineer Company was formed by 4th Engineer Regiment in Verona for the 132nd Armored Division "Ariete". On 11 August 1941 132nd Mixed Engineer Company was split to form the 132nd Engineer Company and the 232nd Connections Company, which both entered the newly formed XXXII Mixed Engineer Battalion. The division participated in the Western Desert Campaign. The division and battalion were destroyed in the Second Battle of El Alamein in November 1942 and declared lost due to wartime events on 8 December 1942.

Cold War 

On 23 May 1948 the Italian Army formed the Armored Brigade "Ariete" in Rome. The brigade included a connections platoon that grew over the next years into a company. The brigade had been transferred in 1948 to the city of Pordenone in the Friuli region in Northern Italy. On 1 October 1952 the brigade was expanded to Armored Division "Ariete". On 1 October 1958 the company was expanded to Signal Battalion "Ariete" and based in the city of Casarsa. The battalion consisted of a command, a command platoon, and two signal companies.

During the 1975 army reform the army disbanded the regimental level and newly independent battalions were granted for the first time their own flags. During the reform signal battalions were renamed for mountain passes. On 1 November 1975 the Signal Battalion "Ariete" was renamed 232nd Signal Battalion "Fadalto". After the reform the battalion consisted of a command, a command and services platoon, two signal companies, and a repairs and recovery platoon. On 12 November 1976 the battalion was granted a flag by decree 846 of the President of the Italian Republic Giovanni Leone.

For its conduct and work after the 1976 Friuli earthquake the battalion was awarded a Bronze Medal of Army Valour, which was affixed to the battalion's flag.

In 1986 the Armored Division "Ariete was disbanded and therefore on 1 August 1986 the battalion was transferred to the 5th Army Corps' Signal Command. On 1 June 1989 the battalion was reorganized and now consisted of a command, a command and services company, the 1st and 2nd signal center companies, and the 3rd Radio Relay Company.

With the end of the Cold War the Italian Army began to draw down its forces and on 30 April 1991 the battalion was disbanded. On 13 May 1991 the flag of the 232nd Signal Battalion "Fadalto" was transferred to the Shrine of the Flags in the Vittoriano in Rome.

Recent times 
On 29 September 2004 the 232nd Signal Regiment was formed in Avellino as a projection signal regiment capable to deploy and operate outside Italy. The regiment consisted of a command, a command and services company, and the Battalion "Legnano" with three signal companies. The regiment received the flag and traditions of the 232nd Signal Battalion "Fadalto", as well as the traditions of the Signal Battalion "Legnano", which had been part of the Infantry Division "Legnano" and was disbanded on 29 November 1975. On 1 October 2015 the regiment formed the Battalion "Fadalto".

Current structure 
As of 2022 the 232nd Signal Regiment consists of:

  Regimental Command, in Avellino
 Command and Logistic Support Company
 Battalion "Legnano"
 1st Signal Company
 2nd Signal Company
 3rd Signal Company
  Battalion "Fadalto"
 4th Signal Company
 5th Signal Company
 6th Signal Company

The Command and Logistic Support Company fields the following platoons: C3 Platoon, Transport and Materiel Platoon, Medical Platoon, and Commissariat Platoon.

External links
 Italian Army Website: 232° Reggimento Trasmissioni

References

Signal Regiments of Italy